Pseudoalteromonas phenolica is a marine bacterium species in the genus Pseudoalteromonas.

Strain O-BC30 produces MC21-A (3,3′,5,5′-tetrabromo-2,2′-biphenyldiol) while strain O-BC30T produces MC21-B (2,2′,3-tribromo-biphenyl-4-4′-dicarboxylic acid). Those two substances show antibacterial activity against methicillin-resistant Staphylococcus aureus.

References

External links 

Alteromonadales
Bacteria described in 2003